Anthony Joseph Sager (born March 3, 1965) is a former Major League Baseball (MLB) right-handed pitcher. He is currently the roving pitching instructor for the Detroit Tigers. Sager played for the San Diego Padres (1994), Colorado Rockies (1995) and Detroit Tigers (1996–1998).

College career
He is an alumnus of the University of Toledo. He played both college football and college baseball at Toledo.

Playing career
Drafted by the San Diego Padres in the 10th round of the 1988 MLB amateur draft, Sager made his Major League Baseball debut with the San Diego Padres on April 4, 1994, and appeared in his final game with the Detroit Tigers on September 26, 1998.

Coaching career
Prior to being promoted to the roving pitching instructor in 2013, Sager was the pitching coach for the Toledo Mud Hens. On June 27, 2018, Sager was named bullpen coach for the Detroit Tigers.

References

External links

1965 births
Living people
Baseball players from Columbus, Ohio
Colorado Rockies players
Detroit Tigers coaches
Detroit Tigers players
Major League Baseball pitchers
San Diego Padres players
Charleston Rainbows players
Colorado Springs Sky Sox players
Gulf Coast Reds players
Indianapolis Indians players
Las Vegas Stars (baseball) players
Spokane Indians players
Toledo Mud Hens players
Wichita Wranglers players
Toledo Rockets football players
Toledo Rockets baseball players